Jürgen or Jurgen is a popular masculine given name in Germany, Estonia, Belgium and the Netherlands. It is cognate with George. Notable people named Jürgen include:

A
Jürgen Ahrend (born 1930), German organ builder
Jürgen Alzen (born 1962), German race car driver
Jürgen Arndt, East German rower
Jürgen Aschoff (1913–1998), German physician and biologist

B
Jürgen Barth (born 1947), German engineer and racecar driver
Jürgen Bartsch (1946–1976), German serial killer
Jürgen von Beckerath (1920–2016), German Egyptologist
Jürgen Berghahn (born 1960), German politician
Jürgen Bertow (born 1950), East German rower
Jürgen Blin (born 1943), West German boxer
Jürgen Bogs (born 1947), German football manager
Jürgen Brähmer (born 1978), German boxer
Jürgen Bräuninger, South African composer and professor
Jürgen Budday (born 1948), German conductor

C
Jürgen Cain Külbel (born 1956), German journalist and investigator
Jürgen Chrobog (born 1940), German diplomat
Jürgen Colin (born 1981), Dutch footballer
Jürgen Colombo (born 1949), West German cyclist
Jürgen Croy (born 1946), East German footballer

D
Jürgen Dehmel (born 1958), German bass guitarist and songwriter
Jürgen Drews (born 1945), German singer
Jürgen Damm, Mexican footballer of German descent
Jürgen Dirkx, Dutch footballer

E
Jürgen Ehlers (1929–2008), German physicist
Jürgen Eschert (born 1941), West German canoeist
Jürgen Evers (born 1964), West German sprinter

F
Jürgen Fanghänel (born 1951), East German boxer
Jürgen von Farensbach (1551–1602), Baltic German nobleman and Livonian general
Jürgen Fassbender (born 1948), West German tennis player
Jürgen Flimm (born 1941), German theater and opera director

G
Jürgen Gauß (born 1960), German chemist
Jürgen Gauß (officer) (1918–1996), German military commander
Jürgen Geschke (born 1943), East German cyclist
Jürgen Gjasula (born 1985), Albanian footballer
Jürgen Gmehling (born 1946), German chemist
Jürgen Goslar (born 1927), German actor and director
Jürgen Grabowski (1944–2022), West German footballer
Jürgen Graf (born 1951), Swiss author and pseudohistorian
Jürgen-Peter Graf (born 1952), German lawyer
Jürgen Gröbler (born 1946), German rowing coach
Jürgen Groh (born 1956), West German footballer

H
Jürgen Haase (born 1945), East German runner
Jürgen Habermas (born 1929), German sociologist and philosopher
Jürgen Hartmann (born 1962), German footballer and coach
Jürgen Henkys (1929–2015), German theologian
Jürgen Henn (born 1987), Estonian football manager and coach
Jürgen Heuser (born 1953), East German weightlifter
Jürgen Hildebrand (born 1948), East German handball player
Jürgen Hingsen (born 1958), West German decathlete

K
Jürgen Klinsmann (born 1964), German footballer, manager and pundit
Jürgen Klopp (born 1967), German footballer and manager
Jürgen Koch
Jürgen Kocka
Jürgen Kohler
Jürgen Kurbjuhn
Jürgen Kuresoo

L
Jürgen Ligi
Jürgen von der Lippe, stage name of German television presenter, entertainer, actor and comedian Hans-Jürgen Dohrenkamp (born 1948)
Jürgen Loacker
Jürgen Locadia

M
Jürgen Macho
Jürgen Mandl
Jürgen Marcus
Jürgen May
Jürgen Melzer
Jürgen Milewski
Jürgen Mittelstraß
Jürgen Möllemann (1945–2003), German politician
Jürgen Moltmann
Jürgen Mossack
Jürgen Moser
Jürgen Möllemann

N
Jürgen Neukirch
Jürgen Nöldner

O
Jürgen Oesten
Jürgen Ovens

P
Jürgen Paeke
Jürgen Pahl
Jürgen Panis
Jürgen Partenheimer
Jürgen Patocka
Jürgen Pezzi
Jürgen Pommerenke
Jürgen Ponto
Jürgen Prochnow

R
Jürgen Raab
Jürgen Reil
Jürgen Rieger
Jürgen Rijkers (born 1967), Dutch DJ, remixer, producer and artist known as DJ Jurgen
Jürgen Röber
Jürgen Rohwer
Jürgen Roland
Jürgen Rooste (born 1979), Estonian poet
Jürgen Rosenthal
Jürgen Rüttgers

S
Jürgen Säumel
Jürgen Schadeberg
Jürgen Schmidhuber
Jürgen Schmude
Jürgen Schreiber (journalist) (born 1947), German investigative journalist
Jürgen Schreiber (businessman) (born 1962), German business executive
Jürgen E. Schrempp
Jürgen Schröder (disambiguation)
Jürgen Schult
Jürgen Schütze
Jürgen Seeberger
Jürgen Seyfarth
Jürgen Sparwasser
Jürgen Stark
Jürgen Steinmetz, German heavy metal bass guitarist
Jürgen Stock
Jürgen Straub
 Jürgen Stroop (1895–1952), German Nazi SS officer, executed for war crimes
Jürgen F. Strube
Jürgen Sundermann

T
Jürgen Thorwald
Jürgen Todenhöfer
Jürgen Tonkel (born 1962), German actor
Jürgen Trittin
Jürgen Trumpf

U
Jürgen Untermann (1928–2013), German linguist, Indo-Europeanist and epigraphist

V
Jurgen Verstrepen (born 1966), Belgian politician and former radio and television presenter
Jürgen Vollmer (born 1939), German photographer
Jürgen Vsych

W
Jurgen Van de Walle (born 1977), Belgian bicycle road racer
Jürgen Warnatz
Jürgen Warnke
Jürgen Werner (disambiguation) , several people
Jürgen Wullenwever

Z
Jürgen Zimmerling
Jürgen Zopp

See also

Hans-Jürgen
Jurgens
Jürgensen
Jürgenshagen
Jürgenstorf
Jørgen

German masculine given names
Estonian masculine given names